Ablabera is a genus of beetles belonging to the family Melolonthidae.

The species of this genus are found in Southern Africa.

Species

Species:

Ablabera advena 
Ablabera aeneobrunnea 
Ablabera amoena

References

Scarabaeidae
Scarabaeidae genera